Special Treatment (translit. Poseban tretman) is a 1980 Yugoslavian drama film directed by Goran Paskaljević. It was entered into the 1980 Cannes Film Festival where Milena Dravić won the award for Best Supporting Actress. The film was also selected as the Yugoslav entry for the Best Foreign Language Film at the 53rd Academy Awards, but was not accepted as a nominee.

Cast
 Ljuba Tadić - Dr. Ilic
 Danilo Stojković - Steva
 Dušica Žegarac - Jelena
 Milena Dravić - Kaca
 Milan Srdoč - Ceda
 Petar Kralj - Marko
 Radmila Živković - Mila
 Bora Todorović - Rade
 Predrag Bijelić - Dejan
 Bata Živojinović - Direktor
 Pavle Vuisić - Direktorov otac
 Dušan Janićijević - Kum
 Danilo Lazović - Cira

See also
 List of submissions to the 53rd Academy Awards for Best Foreign Language Film
 List of Yugoslav submissions for the Academy Award for Best Foreign Language Film

References

External links

1980 films
1980 drama films
Serbo-Croatian-language films
Serbian drama films
Films directed by Goran Paskaljević
Films with screenplays by Dušan Kovačević
Yugoslav drama films
Films about alcoholism